Chiranjeevi (born 1955) is an Indian actor

This Sanskrit term means immortal. The term is said to be a combination of chiram (permanent or long) and jivi (lived). In Ramayana for example, Hanuman is referred to as Chiranjeevi.

Chiranjeevi or Chiranjivi may also refer to:

People
 Chiranjeevi Sarja (1984 – 2020), Indian film actor in Kannada films
 Gonnabattula Chiranjeevi (born 1992), Indian first-class cricketer

Other use

 Chiranjeevi (1936 film), a 1936 Kannada film directed by K.P. Bhave
 Chiranjeevi (1976 film), a 1976 Kannada film directed by A. Bhimsingh
 Chiranjeevi (1984 film), a 1984 Indian Tamil film directed by K. Shankar
 Chiranjeevi (1985 film), a 1985 Telugu language film directed by C. V. Rajendran
 Chiranjivis, the immortals in Hinduism

Sanskrit-language names
Hindu given names
Telugu names
Telugu given names